Credito Siciliano was an Italian bank headquartered in Acireale, Sicily and previously Palermo. It was a subsidiary of Credito Valtellinese until its merger by incorporation into Credito Valtellinese in June 2018.

The bank had 136 branches, 133 located in Sicily (Province of Agrigento: 4; Province of Caltanissetta: 7; Province of Catania: 51; Province of Enna: 2; Province of Messina: 18; Province of Palermo: 26; Province of Ragusa: 9; Province of Siracusa: 6 and Province of Trapani: 10), plus 3 more in mainland Italy (Milan, Rome, Turin).

Predecessors

Banca del Monte Sant'Agata
Three separate mounts of piety were founded in Catania, at that time part of the Kingdom of Sicily. Monte Grande di Pietà di Sant'Agata, the second mount of the city that named after St.Agatha of Sicily, was founded on 17 December 1809. The institute was in special administration from 1992. The institute was also under a.s. in 1981.

In 1994, a company limited by shares, was incorporated by the administrator as Nuova Banca del Monte Sant'Agata S.p.A., acquiring the assets and liabilities of the institute; the old institute was being liquidated. The new legal person was later acquired by fellow Sicilian bank Banca Popolare Sant'Angelo.

Banca Regionale Sant'Angelo
Banca Regionale Sant'Angelo was an Italian bank based on 1/E via Siracusa, Palermo, Sicily. The bank was formed by Banca Popolare Sant'Angelo injected part of the bank assets to Nuova Banca del Monte Sant'Agata S.p.A. on 1 January 2001, as well as sold the company to Credito Artigiano (part of Credito Valtellinese group) in mid-2001, by the subscription of the capital increase of Banca Regionale Sant'Angelo, by Credito Artigiano. The shares of Banca Regionale Sant'Angelo was also distributed to the shareholders of Banca Popolare Sant'Angelo, making Credito Artigiano launched a public acquisition offer to buy the remaining 55% shares of the Banca Regionale in 2001. In 2002, Banca Regionale Sant'Angelo absorbed other subsidiaries of Credito Valtellinese to form Credito Siciliano.

The former headquarters of Banca Monte Sant'Agata on via Sant'Euplio, Catania, was sold to a company. The site was refurbished as a hotel.

Leasingroup Sicilia
Leasingroup Sicilia was a finance leasing company based in Sicily. Banca Popolare Sant'Angelo increased it stake in the company in 1990s, but spin off to inject the stake to Banca Regionale Sant'Angelo circa 2001. As at 31 December 2001, Banca Popolare di Lodi also owned 5.12% stake .

History
Credito Siciliano was formed on 1 July 2002 by the merger of Banca Popolare Santa Venera (a subsidiary of Credito Valtellinese), Banca Regionale Sant'Angelo (a subsidiary of Credito Artigiano), Leasingroup Sicilia (a subsidiary of Banca Regionale Sant'Angelo, with BP Santa Venera had a minority interests) and the retail division of Cassa San Giacomo (a subsidiary of Credito Valtellinese). The new bank was owned by Credito Valtellinese for 39.43% shares, as well as through its subsidiary Credito Artigiano for an additional 35.79% shares at that time. In 2008, the bank recorded a profit of 12.4 million euros.

In May 2018, the merger by incorporation of Credito Siciliano into Creval was approved, with the exchange ratio set at 78.35 new Creval shares. On 25 June 2018, the merger by incorporation into Credito Valtellinese became effective.

References

See also

 Banca Agricola Popolare di Ragusa, an Italian bank
 Banca Nuova, a subsidiary of Banca Popolare di Vicenza
 Banco Popolare Siciliano, a brand of Banco Popolare
 Banco di Sicilia, a defunct UniCredit subsidiary

Banks established in 2002
2002 establishments in Italy
Banks of Italy
Companies based in Palermo
Credito Valtellinese
Former cooperative banks of Italy
Mounts of piety